Willem Vink (born 1931 in Schiedam, South Holland, Netherlands) is a Dutch botanist.

References

1931 births
Living people
20th-century Dutch botanists
21st-century Dutch botanists
Leiden University alumni
People from Schiedam